Myrexis is a biopharmaceutical company based in Salt Lake City, Utah, USA. It focused on drug development in several areas of medicine, in particular cancer therapy and auto-immune diseases. It was founded in 1999 as a spin-off from Myriad Genetics and was originally known as Myriad Pharmaceuticals. Richard B. Brewer was its CEO from May 2012 until his death in August 2012.

In February 2012 the company announced they had suspended development activity on all of its clinical and preclinical programs and appointed an investment company Stifel Nicolaus Weisel to evaluate strategic alternatives. In November 2012, the board of Myrexis announced that it planned to put the company into liquidation subject to shareholder approval. In January 2013, the board reversed its decision, cancelled the liquidation, declared a special cash distribution to shareholders and appointed Jonathan M. Couchman (chairman of Xselos Holdings) as president and chief executive officer. The remaining members of the board then resigned.

References

Pharmaceutical companies of the United States
Pharmaceutical companies established in 1999
Companies based in Salt Lake City
1999 establishments in Utah